The 2016 UT Martin Skyhawks football team represented the University of Tennessee at Martin as a member of the Ohio Valley Conference (OVC) during the 2016 NCAA Division I FCS football season. Led by 11th-year head coach Jason Simpson, the Skyhawks compiled an overall record of 7–5 with a mark of 6–2 in conference play, placing second in the OVC. UT Martin played home games at Graham Stadium in Martin, Tennessee.

Schedule

Game summaries

at Cincinnati

at Hawaii

Bacone

Tennessee Tech

at Tennessee State

Austin Peay

at Murray State

at Georgia State

Eastern Kentucky

at Eastern Illinois

Southeast Missouri State

at Jacksonville State

References

UT Martin
UT Martin Skyhawks football seasons
UT Martin Skyhawks football